Patricia Gucci (born 1 March 1963) is an Italian businesswoman and member of the Gucci family. She is the only daughter of Aldo Gucci and granddaughter of Guccio Gucci who founded the company in 1921.

Biography 
She is the daughter of Aldo Gucci, the patriarch of the Gucci fashion empire, and Bruna Palombo; the two met when Bruna was working at the Gucci flagship store in Rome. He was still married to the mother of his three sons, and adultery was illegal in Italy, so they lived in England. They married when Patricia was twenty-four years old. Patricia was elected to Gucci's Board of directors at age nineteen.

In 2016, Patricia published a memoir, In the Name of Gucci, in which she revealed that she did not learn that her father had another family and wife until she was ten years old. Her elder half-brother Paolo Gucci broke away from the family firm and tried to set up a rival company. In Aldo's last years, he was involved in a tax scandal and his sons, together with his nephew Maurizio, squeezed control of Gucci away from him.  Aldo, in turn, made Patricia his sole heir.  The Gucci family business was fully sold in 1993 by Patricia's cousin Maurizio Gucci.

In 2018, she founded Aviteur, a luxury travel lifestyle company.

Personal life 
She has three daughters, Alexandra, Victoria, and Isabella.

Gucci was married to Joseph Ruffalo, a music executive who worked with Prince and Earth, Wind & Fire. Gucci divorced Ruffalo in 2007, because he had sexually abused her daughters Alexandra and Victoria since the early 1990s. In 2020, Patricia Gucci was named in a lawsuit brought forward by her daughter Alexandra for the childhood abuse by her stepfather.

References

External links
 

1963 births
Living people
Gucci people
Women business executives
Alumni of Aiglon College